The Troy Haymakers played their final season in 1872 as a  member of the National Association of Professional Base Ball Players. They finished fifth in the league with a record of 15–10.

Regular season

Season standings

Record vs. opponents

Roster

Player stats

Batting
Note: G = Games played; AB = At bats; H = Hits; Avg. = Batting average; HR = Home runs; RBI = Runs batted in

Starting pitchers 
Note: G = Games pitched, IP = Innings Pitched; W = Wins; L = Losses; ERA = Earned run average; SO = Strikeouts

Relief pitchers 
Note: G = Games pitched; W = Wins; L = Losses; SV = Saves; ERA = Earned run average; SO = Strikeouts

References
1872 Troy Haymakers season at Baseball Reference

Troy Haymakers seasons
Troy Haymakers Season, 1872
Troy